The Fat Man is a 1951 American film noir crime film directed by William Castle.  It is based on a radio drama of the same name, with J. Scott Smart reprising his role as Brad Runyan, a portly detective.

The cast includes Rock Hudson and Julie London. Originally released by Universal Pictures, the film is now in the public domain.

William Castle later called it "a potboiler of little merit, except that I was able to cast Rock Hudson... and to use Emmett Kelly, the Ringling Brothers clown, as the villain."

Plot
Portly private detective Runyan is asked by dental nurse Adams to investigate the unexplained murder of her boss. Suspicion falls on disappeared patient Clark, last seen being driven from his appointment by the chauffeur of probable gangster Gordon. Through his means, Runyan contacts Boyd, Clark's former lover and briefly his wife, who reveals that Clark had once spent time in jail. The police tell Runyan it was for robbery of half a million dollars which were not recovered. In jail, Clark had a cellmate Deets, a circus clown, with whom he shared everything. On release, Deets had claimed Clark's share of the loot from Gordon, the heist's organizer, in order to fulfil his ambition to own his own circus.

Deet's side of the deal was to eliminate Clark, whose corpse he left in a burnt-out truck. When he realised Clark had undergone dental treatment, and that this meant Clark could be identified by dental records, Deets killed first the dentist and then Nurse Adams as well. Runyan locates Deets, and in a final shoot-out, Deets is fatally wounded and dies in his own big ring.

Cast
J. Scott Smart as Brad Runyan
Julie London as Pat Boyd
Rock Hudson as Roy Clark
Clinton Sundberg as Bill Norton
Jayne Meadows as Nurse Jane Adams
John Russell as Gene Gordon
Jerome Cowan as Det. Lt. Stark
Emmett Kelly as Ed Deets
Lucille Barkley as Lola Gordon
Robert Osterloh as "Fletch" Fletcher
Harry Lewis as Happy Stevens
Teddy Hart as Shifty

See also
 List of American films of 1951

Soundtrack
"A Dream Ago" (Music by Milton Rosen, lyrics by Everett Carter)

References

External links

1951 films
Film noir
American mystery films
American black-and-white films
Universal Pictures films
1951 crime drama films
Films directed by William Castle
American crime drama films
Films based on radio series
1950s English-language films
1950s American films